'Along with Uppugunduru Maddirala Muppalla Eadumudi villagesNaguluppalapadu' (NG Padu) is a mandal in Prakasam district of Andhra Pradesh state.

Mandals in Prakasam district